Zdeněk Tesař (born 30 July 1964) is a former speedway rider from the Czech Republic.

Speedway career 
He reached two Speedway World Championship finals in 1990 and 1992. He won the 1995 Czech Republic Individual Speedway Championship.

He rode in the top tier of British Speedway riding for Belle Vue Aces, Ipswich Witches and Peterborough Panthers from 1991 until 2002.

World Final appearances

Individual World Championship
 1990 -  Bradford, Odsal Stadium - 13th - 2pts
 1992 -  Wrocław, Olympic Stadium - 15th - 5pts

World Pairs Championship
 1989 -  Leszno, Alfred Smoczyk Stadium (with Bohumil Brhel) - 7th - 25pts
 1991 -  Poznań, Olimpia Poznań Stadium (with Roman Matoušek and Bohumil Brhel) - 5th 18pts

References 

1964 births
Living people
Czech speedway riders
Belle Vue Aces riders
Ipswich Witches riders
Peterborough Panthers riders
Sportspeople from Ostrava